is a passenger railway station located in the city of Shimanto, Kōchi Prefecture, Japan. It is operated by the Tosa Kuroshio Railway and has the station number "TK42".

Lines and Trains
Only local trains stop at the station.

Layout
The station consists of a side platform serving a single track on an embankment. There is no station building, but an enclosed shelter is provided on the platform for waiting passengers. Access to platform is by means of a flight of steps. A bike shed and parking lots for cars are available near the base of the steps.

Adjacent stations

History

Passenger statistics
In fiscal 2011, the station was used by an average of 9 passengers daily.

Surrounding area
Shimanto Municipal Higashi Nakasuji Junior High School
Shimanto Municipal Higashinakasuji Elementary School
Nakasuji River
Japan National Route 56

See also
 List of railway stations in Japan

References

External links
Station timetable

Railway stations in Kōchi Prefecture
Railway stations in Japan opened in 1997
Shimanto, Kōchi (city)